Alberta Provincial Highway No. 567, commonly referred to as Highway 567, is a highway in the province of  Alberta, Canada. It runs west–east through the Calgary Region north of the City of Calgary.

Highway 567 begins at its intersection with Highway 22 (Cowboy Trail), 10 km north of the Town of Cochrane, and travels eastward past Big Hill Springs Provincial Park, to Highway 772 (Symons Valley Road) where it jogs north for 3 km before it continues east through the City of Airdrie and intersects Highway 2.  The highway ends at Highway 9, 4 km southeast of the Town of Irricana.

The highway is also known as Big Hill Springs Road between Highway 22 and Highway 772 and Veterans Boulevard within Airdrie.  Prior to 2005, the highway was named Airdrie Road west of Highway 2 and Irricana Road east of Highway 2.

Major intersections 
Starting at the west end of Highway 567:

References 

567